Pinacolone (3,3-dimethyl-2-butanone) is an important ketone in organic chemistry. It is a colorless liquid and has a slight peppermint- or camphor- odor. It is a precursor to triazolylpinacolone in the synthesis of the fungicide triadimefon and in synthesis of the herbicide metribuzin.  The molecule is an unsymmetrical ketone.  The α-methyl group can participate in condensation reactions. The carbonyl group can undergo the usual reactions (hydrogenation, reductive amination, etc.). It is a Schedule 3 compound under the Chemical Weapons Convention 1993, due to being related to pinacolyl alcohol, which is used in the production of soman. It is also a controlled export in Australia Group member states.

Preparation
Most famously, at least in the classroom, pinacolone arises by the pinacol rearrangement, which occurs by protonation of pinacol (2,3-dimethylbutane-2,3-diol).

Industrially pinacolone is made by the hydrolysis of 4,4,5-trimethyl-1,3-dioxane, which is the product of isoprene and formaldehyde via the Prins reaction.  It also is generated by ketonization of pivalic acid and acetic acid or acetone over metal oxide catalysts.  3-Methylbutanal is a starting material for 2,3-dimethyl-2-butene, which in turn is converted to pinacolone. Pinacolone can also be produced from 2-methy-2-butanol when reacted with C5 alcohols.

Drug Uses
Pinacolone is produced in large amounts for use in fungicides, herbicides, and pesticides.

retrosynthetic analysis of vibunazole showed that it was derived from pinacolone.
It is also used to prepare pinacidil, as well as naminidil.
Stiripentol
Tribuzone
Pivaloylacetonitrile is used in the synthesis of Doramapimod.
Triadimefon
Diclobutrazole
Paclobutrazol
Valconazole
 Diethylstilbestrol pinacolone [18922-13-9].
Some kind of Bisphenol A derivative also 
Thiofanox

See also
Pinacol
Pinacolyl alcohol
Soman

References

Hexanones
Tert-butyl compounds
Nerve agent precursors